The North Seas Energy Cooperation (NSEC) officially the Political Declaration on energy cooperation between the North Seas Countries
previously the, North Seas Countries Offshore Grid Initiative (NSCOGI), is a collaboration between EU member-states and Norway to create an integrated offshore energy grid which links wind farms and other renewable energy sources across the northern seas of Europe. It is one of several proposed European super grid schemes. 

Electricity would be transmitted via high-voltage direct current cables, allowing it to be sold and exchanged in all involved countries. It would also make it easier to optimise energy production, and make the system overall less susceptible to the climate; Norway's hydroelectric power plants could act as a "giant battery", storing the power produced and releasing it at peak times, or when wind strength is low. Several high-voltage direct current interconnectors such as the North Sea Link between Norway and Britain (operational since 2021) have been seen as integral parts of the project.

History
The North Sea Offshore Grid was proposed by the European Commission in the Second Strategic Energy Review, published in November 2008. The initiative was identified as one of the six priority energy infrastructure actions of the European Union. According to the European Commission, the North Sea Offshore Grid should become one of the building blocks of a future European super grid.

The political declaration of the North Seas Countries Offshore Grid Initiative was signed on 7 December 2009 at the European Union Energy Council. The declaration was signed by the EU members Germany, United Kingdom, France, Denmark, Sweden, the Netherlands, Belgium, Ireland and Luxembourg, as well as Norway.

The European Commission planned to publish a "Blueprint for a North Sea Grid" in 2010.

Member states
The member states of the North Seas Energy Cooperation are; Belgium, Denmark, France, Germany, the Republic of Ireland, Luxembourg, Netherlands, Norway and Sweden, together with the European Commission. 

The United Kingdom was previously a member but left following Brexit on 31 January 2020. The UK agreed to reengage with NSEC at the first summit of the European Political Community in October 2022, and formally signed a agreement for cooperation with NSEC in December 2022.

Significance
Minister for Communications, Energy and Natural Resources for the Government of Ireland, Eamon Ryan, said of the initiative:

Studies
A techno-economic study into the North Sea Offshore Grid, has been set up within the European Union's Intelligent Energy Europe programme, to consider the technical, economic, policy and regulatory aspects of the possible grid, focused on the North Sea and Baltic region.

Belgium is building a national modular offshore grid, connecting several wind farms for common transfer of power onto land at Zeebrugge, near the Nemo Link to England.

Support
Friends of the Supergrid, a group of companies and organisations interested in promoting the concept and influencing the development of a super grid within Europe, has taken an interest in the North Sea Grid proposals. The organisation has proposed that Phase I of the supergrid should integrate the UK's North Sea renewables with interconnections to Germany and Norway.

See also

 DESERTEC
 European super grid
 High-voltage direct current
 ISLES project (Irish-Scottish Links on Energy Study) – potential complementary offshore grid
 List of HVDC projects
 List of offshore wind farms in the North Sea
 North Sea Wind Power Hub
 POWER cluster
 Renewable Electricity and the Grid
 Super grid
 SuperSmart Grid
 Synchronous grid of Continental Europe
 Wide area synchronous grid

References

External links
 North Seas Energy Cooperation
 North Sea Offshore Grid
 Political declaration on the North Seas Countries Offshore Grid Initiative (PDF)
 Signing ceremony of the political declaration on the North Seas Countries Offshore Grid Initiative (video)

Electrical interconnectors in the North Sea
Proposed energy projects
Proposed electric power infrastructure in Europe
Electric power transmission systems in Europe